Batagraf (established 2005 in Oslo, Norway) is a Norwegian percussion ensemble, created and led by Jon Balke. Formed in 2003, the concept of the group was to research and investigate the relation between rhythm and language, inspired by various African and ethnic traditions. The group functions as a core group with a pool of collaborators. In 2009 they attended the Nattjazz in Bergen with the entertainers Are Kalvø and Espen Beranek Holm, two of Norway's most popular radio personalities, for the show «Pratagraph» gaining brilliant reviews. Batagraf has oalso collaborated with sound poets like Jaap Blonk and Sidsel Endresen, as well as rappers and instrumental soloists like Runar Gudnason, Nils Petter Molvaer, Arve Henriksen and more.

Members
Jon Balke (keyboards, electronics, tungoné, darbouka, percussion)
Helge Norbakken (sabar, gorong, djembe, talking drum, shakers, percussion)
Snorre Bjerck (gorong, percussion)

Discography
 2005: Statements (ECM Records)
 2011:Say And Play (ECM Records)
 2016: On Anodyne (Grappa Music), with Trondheim Voices
 2018: Delights of Decay (Jazzland Recordings, with No.4, Mathias Eick and Trygve Seim

References

External links
Batagraf Official Website
Magnetic Music Official Website

Musical groups established in 1992
1992 establishments in Norway
Musical groups from Oslo
ECM Records artists
Grappa Music artists
Jazzland Recordings (1997) artists